Clingen is a town in the Kyffhäuserkreis district, in Thuringia, Germany. It is situated 16 km southeast of Sondershausen, and 30 km north of Erfurt.

as of 31 December
Source: Thuringian State Department of Statistics

Sons and daughters of the town
 Rudolf Boese (1839-1912), Member of Landtag
 Günter Grüner (1942-2016), Member of Thuringian State Parliament

References 

Towns in Thuringia
Kyffhäuserkreis
Schwarzburg-Sondershausen